Roben Obama Nsue Ondo (born 21 June 1993), also known as Rubén Darío, is an Equatoguinean footballer who plays as a striker for Liga Nacional de Fútbol club Akonangui FC and the Equatorial Guinea national team.

Club career
Born in Ebeiñ-Yenkeng, Niefang District, Centro Sur Province, Obama spent five seasons in Atlético Malabo. He was the top scorer of the Equatoguinean Second Division in 2008 with 12 goals and of the Equatoguinean Premier League in 2012 with 16 goals.

For the 2013 season, Obama has signed with Leones Vegetarianos, another Malabo's football club.

International career
On 8 January 2015, Obama was included in Esteban Becker's 23-men list for the 2015 Africa Cup of Nations. He made his international debut 17 days later as a second-half substitute in a 2-0 win against Gabon.

Statistics

International

Honours

Club
Atlético Malabo
Equatoguinean Second Division: 2008

Leones Vegetarianos
Equatoguinean Cup: 2014

References

External links
CAF profile

1993 births
Living people
Association football forwards
Equatoguinean footballers
People from Centro Sur
Equatorial Guinea international footballers
2015 Africa Cup of Nations players
Leones Vegetarianos FC players
Equatoguinean expatriate footballers
Equatoguinean expatriate sportspeople in Ethiopia
Expatriate footballers in Ethiopia